Yang Zhizhong (born 25 December 1968) is a Chinese wrestler. He competed in the men's Greco-Roman 48 kg at the 1988 Summer Olympics.

References

1968 births
Living people
Chinese male sport wrestlers
Olympic wrestlers of China
Wrestlers at the 1988 Summer Olympics
Place of birth missing (living people)
Wrestlers at the 1990 Asian Games
Asian Games competitors for China
21st-century Chinese people
20th-century Chinese people